Ali Akbar (born 10 March 1952) is a Bangladeshi academic. He is the former vice-chancellor of Bangladesh Agricultural University (BAU).

Education and career
Akbar earned his bachelor's and master's from the Animal Husbandry Faculty at BAU in 1975 and 1977 respectively. He then joined as a lecturer in Animal Nutrition Department in 1977. He obtained his Ph.D. from the University of Aberdeen. He was promoted to a professor in 1993.

Upon the resignation of Rafiqul Haque, the previous vice-chancellor of BAU, Akbar was appointed to the position on 25 May 2015 for a four-year term.

References

Living people
1950 births
People from Bogra District
Academic staff of Bangladesh Agricultural University
Alumni of the University of Aberdeen
Vice-Chancellors of Bangladesh Agricultural University